Sarah MacMaster (born 4 July 1983) is a former Canadian badminton player who competed in international level events. She is a bronze medal at the 2007 Pan American Games and a bronze medalist at the 2007 Pan Am Badminton Championships. Her doubles partner is Valerie Loker.

References

1983 births
Living people
Badminton players at the 2007 Pan American Games
Canadian female badminton players
Sportspeople from Surrey, British Columbia
Sportspeople from Vancouver
Pan American Games competitors for Canada
Pan American Games medalists in badminton
Pan American Games bronze medalists for Canada
Medalists at the 2007 Pan American Games